Étienne Falgoux (born 19 January 1993) is a French rugby union player, currently playing in the prop for Top 14 side Clermont Auvergne.

International career
Falgoux won his first cap for France as a replacement in the side's win over Scotland in the 2019 Six Nations.

References

External links
 France profile at FFR
 Clermont Auvergne profile
 

1993 births
Living people
French rugby union players
ASM Clermont Auvergne players
Rugby union props
France international rugby union players
Sportspeople from Puy-de-Dôme